The Environmental Science Center is a research center at Qatar University and was established in 1980 to promote environmental studies across the state of Qatar with main focus on marine science, atmospheric and biological sciences. For the past 18 years, ESC monitored and studied Hawksbill turtle nesting sites in Qatar.

History 

 in 1980 it was named Scientific and Applied Research Center (SARC).
 in 2005 it was restructured and renamed Environmental Studies Center (ESC).
 in 2015, the business name was changed to Environmental Science Center (ESC) to better reflect the research-driven objectives.

Research clusters 
The ESC has 3 major research clusters that cover areas of strategic importance to Qatar. The clusters are:

 Atmospheric sciences cluster
 Earth sciences cluster
 Marine sciences cluster with 2 majors:
 Terrestrial Ecology
 Physical and Chemical Oceanography

UNESCO Chair in marine sciences 
The first of its kind in the Arabian Gulf region, United Nations Educational, Scientific and Cultural Organization (UNESCO) have announced the establishment of the UNESCO Chair in marine sciences at QU's Environmental Science Center. The chair is aiming to providing sustainable marine environment in the Arabian Gulf and protection of marine ecosystems.

Inventions 

 Marine clutch technology.
 Mushroom artificial reef technology  (mushroom forest).

Accreditation 
The ESC labs have been granted ISO/IEC 17025 by American Association of Laboratory Accreditation (A2LA), affirming their status as world-class facilities operating to best practice.

Facilities 
ESC is the home of wide range of facilities. The most notable one is the mobile labs onboard the JANAN Research Vessel.

JANAN is a 42.80 m. multipurpose Research Vessel and was named after the island located in the western coast of the Qatari peninsula. It was donated to Qatar University by H.H.  Sheikh Tamim bin Hamad Al Thani the Amir of Qatar.

JANAN is used extensively in studying the state of marine environment in the Exclusive Economic Zone (EEZ) of the State of Qatar and to advance critical marine environmental studies and research in Qatar and the wider Gulf.

The center also has 12 labs equipped with state-of-arts instruments.

See also 
 Qatar University
 Qatar University Library
 Mariam Al Maadeed
 Center for Advanced Materials (CAM)

External links 
 Research and Graduate Studies Office at Qatar University
 Qatar University Newsroom

References 

1980 establishments in Qatar
Organisations based in Doha
Research institutes in Qatar
Educational institutions established in 1980
Qatar University
Education by subject
Human impact on the environment
Oceans
Fishing
Earth sciences
Nature
Biology